This is a list of writers on horsemanship and equitation and their principal published works; some minor works may have been omitted. Usually only the first edition of each work is shown; subsequent editions are shown only if the title was changed. Titles of some works may be abbreviated. Full bibliographical details are not given. Authors are listed by default in order of the date of the first published work; works for each author are listed in order of date of the first known edition.

Before 1700

1700 to 1799

1800 to 1899

1900 to 1999

2000 to the present

References 

Horsemanship